Nicholas Lee is a Singaporean actor and producer best known for portraying Ronnie Tan on the English-language sitcom Under One Roof.

Early life and education
Lee attended the Anglo-Chinese School.

Career
Lee starred as Ronnie Tan in the English-language sitcom Under One Roof, which aired from 1995 to 2003. He starred as Dr. Benedict Wee in the English-language sitcom My Grandson, the Doctor, which aired from 1996 to 1997. He starred in the play Closer in 2000. In 1999, he starred in the horror television series Shiver.

His contract with the Television Corporation of Singapore ended in 2000, and was not renewed. He and his friend Bernard Oh founded XXX Studios, a production company, in 2002. In 2003, he starred in the comedy film City Sharks.

In 2007, he starred in the series Random Acts. He starred in the 2008 comedy television series First Class.

He produced the television drama 2025.

Personal life
He is married to Catherine Kee, a dancer and actress.

Filmography

Films
The Dead Zone (2002)
City Sharks (2003)

Television
Under One Roof (1995 - 2003)
My Grandson, the Doctor (1996 - 1997)
Shiver (1999)
Brand New Towkay (2001)
The Monkey King (2001)
Stories of Love: The Anthology Series (2006)
Random Acts (2007)
Cosmo & George (2008)
First Class (2008 - 2010)
The Pupil (2011)
Zero Hero (2011)
Mata Mata (2013)
Fableicious (2014)
Mata Mata: A New Era (2014)
2025 (2015; also served as producer)
Mata Mata: A New Generation (2015)
Working Class (2015)
Sunny Side Up (2022)

References

Living people
Singaporean male film actors
Singaporean male television actors
Year of birth missing (living people)